Live Oak is an unincorporated community and census-designated place (CDP) in Horry County, South Carolina, United States. As of the 2020 census it had a population of 93.

Demographics

2020 census

Note: the US Census treats Hispanic/Latino as an ethnic category. This table excludes Latinos from the racial categories and assigns them to a separate category. Hispanics/Latinos can be of any race.

References 

Census-designated places in Horry County, South Carolina
Census-designated places in South Carolina